The following radio stations broadcast on FM frequency 104.7 MHz:

Argentina
 Activa in Caleta Olivia, Santa Cruz
 Cadena Alcazar in Oberá, Misiones
 Dakota in Federal, Entre Ríos
 Dale in Tafí Viejo, Tucumán
 La Radio in Concepcion del Bermejo, Chaco
 La Tropi in Comodoro Rivadavia, Chubut
 Líder in Trenque Lauquen, Buenos Aires
 LRN 373 Premium in Santa Rosa Del Conlara, San Luis
 Radio María in Rio Tercero, Córdoba
 Radio Propia in General Pico, La Pampa
 Secla in Avellaneda, Buenos Aires
 Sucesos in Córdoba

Australia
 2ROC in Canberra, Australian Capital Territory
 2BOB in Taree, New South Wales
 2CLR in Grafton, New South Wales
 3GCR in Latrobe Valley, Victoria
 5MMM in Adelaide, South Australia
 3GRR in Echuca, Victoria
 Radio National in Townsville, Queensland
 Triple J in Rockhampton, Queensland

Canada (Channel 284)
 CBAF-FM-7 in Digby, Nova Scotia
 CBCH-FM in Charlottetown, Prince Edward Island
 CBME-FM-1 in Montreal, Quebec
 CBVE-FM in Quebec City, Quebec
 CFDY-FM in Cochrane, Ontario
 CFLO-FM in Mont-Laurier, Quebec
 CFRI-FM in Grande Prairie, Alberta
 CHBZ-FM in Cranbrook, British Columbia
 CIHR-FM in Woodstock, Ontario
 CIPN-FM in Pender Harbour, British Columbia
 CIUR-FM in Winnipeg, Manitoba
 CJFL-FM in Iroquois Falls, Ontario
 CJRG-FM-1 in Murdochville, Quebec
 CKEH-FM in Houston, British Columbia
 CKKS-FM in Sechelt, British Columbia
 CKLZ-FM in Kelowna, British Columbia
 CKOF-FM in Gatineau, Quebec
 VF2013 in Havre-St-Pierre, Quebec
 VF2471 in Canyon Creek, British Columbia
 VF2489 in Campement Eastmain, Quebec
 VF8017 in L'Assomption, Quebec

China 
 CNR Business Radio in Changchun and Hefei
 CNR China Traffic Radio in Zhengzhou
 CNR The Voice of China in Liuzhou

Indonesia
 RadioQu Batam in Batam and Singapore

Italy
 Radio Studio 5 in Sciacca, Sicilia

Jamaica
BBC World Service

Malaysia
 TraXX FM in Kota Bharu, Kelantan

Mexico
XHCI-FM in Acapulco, Guerrero
XHCNE-FM in Cananea, Sonora
XHEHB-FM in San Francisco del Oro, Chihuahua
XHERP-FM in Tampico, Tamaulipas
XHGS-FM in Guasave, Sinaloa
XHICT-FM in Tulum, Quintana Roo
XHLB-FM in Jamay, Jalisco
XHPTLA-FM in San Andrés Tuxtla, Veracruz
XHRGO-FM in Tala, Jalisco
XHRLK-FM in Atlacomulco, Estado de México
XHUGC-FM in Colotlán, Jalisco
XHUGL-FM in Lagos de Moreno, Jalisco

North Macedonia
 Radio KISS in Tetovo, North Macedonia

Philippines
 DWEY in Makati
 DWON in Dagupan
 DWSS-FM in Naga City
 DYAB-FM in Tacloban City
 DXYR in Cagayan De Oro City

United Kingdom
 Abbey104, Sherborne
 Greatest Hits Radio York and North Yorkshire, York

United States (Channel 284)
 KAPU-LP in Watsonville, California
  in Big Sky, Montana
  in Oxnard, California
  in Sitka, Alaska
  in Saint Cloud, Minnesota
  in Baker, Oregon
 KCYC-LP in Yuba City, California
  in Palm Springs, California
  in Florence, Oregon
 KDUX-FM in Hoquiam, Washington
 KEAU in Elko, Nevada
 KELR-LP in Stockton, California
 KELS-LP in Greeley, Colorado
 KERG in Escobares, Texas
  in Klamath Falls, Oregon
 KFGO-FM in Hope, North Dakota
  in Des Arc, Arkansas
 KHMD in Mansfield, Louisiana
 KHSB-FM in Kingsland, Texas
  in Planada, California
 KHUM in Cutten, California
 KIHT in Amboy, California
  in Ketchum, Idaho
 KJUL in Moapa Valley, Nevada
 KKBT in Leone, American Samoa
  in Fairbanks, Alaska
  in Marshfield, Missouri
  in Sioux Falls, South Dakota
  in Wenatchee, Washington
 KKTH in Bosque Farms, New Mexico
 KKVM in Vail, Colorado
 KKYS in Bryan, Texas
 KMKZ-LP in Loveland, Colorado
  in Roswell, New Mexico
  in Mandan, North Dakota
  in Washington, Louisiana
 KNIV in Lyman, Wyoming
  in Sterling, Colorado
 KOJH-LP in Kansas City, Missouri
 KOMF-LP in Denver, Colorado
  in Lanai City, Hawaii
  in Hardy, Arkansas
 KQBK in Waldron, Arkansas
 KQEV-LP in Walnut, California
 KQMJ in Blanket, Texas
 KQSN in Ponca City, Oklahoma
  in Moberly, Missouri
 KREV-LP in Estes Park, Colorado
 KREZ (FM) in Chaffee, Missouri
 KRQL-LP in Santa Ana, California
 KRYH-LP in Temple, Texas
 KSGG in King City, California
 KSLE in Wewoka, Oklahoma
 KSXA-LP in Santa Ana, California
 KTFJ-LP in Burlington, Washington
  in Texarkana, Arkansas
  in Casper, Wyoming
 KVBM-LP in Killeen, Texas
  in Fort Scott, Kansas
 KVIC in Victoria, Texas
  in Decorah, Iowa
 KVLM in Lamesa, Texas
 KWNS in Winnsboro, Texas
  in Vidalia, Louisiana
 KXBZ in Manhattan, Kansas
 KXRN-LP in Laguna Beach, California
  in Burkburnett, Texas
 KZQB-LP in Brownsville, Texas
 KZZP in Mesa, Arizona
  in Crestview, Florida
 WAYG-LP in Miami, Florida
  in Hagerstown, Maryland
  in Belfast, Maine
 WBBS in Fulton, New York
  in Morris, Illinois
 WDDW in Sturtevant, Wisconsin
 WEJO-LP in State College, Pennsylvania
 WELJ in Montauk, New York
 WEQY-LP in Saint Paul, Minnesota
  in Elkhart, Indiana
  in Athens, Georgia
 WGSM-LP in Madisonville, Tennessee
 WHNY-FM in Henry, Tennessee
 WHTP-FM in Kennebunkport, Maine
 WHUP-LP in Hillsborough, North Carolina
 WHWA in Washburn, Wisconsin
 WIOT in Toledo, Ohio
  in Rochester, New York
 WITG-LP in Ocala, Florida
 WITZ-FM in Jasper, Indiana
  in Hazard, Kentucky
  in Folsom, Louisiana
 WJUI-LP in Ramtown, New Jersey
  in San Juan, Puerto Rico
 WKGT-LP in North Adams, Massachusetts
  in Tawas City, Michigan
 WKKY in Geneva, Ohio
 WKQC in Charlotte, North Carolina
 WLMD (FM) in Bushnell, Illinois
 WLNQ in White Pine, Tennessee
 WLRJ in Greenville, Mississippi
 WMRP-LP in Mundy Township, Michigan
  in Montpelier, Vermont
  in Columbia, South Carolina
  in Nashville, Illinois
  in Orleans, Massachusetts
 WOGM-LP in Jamestown, New York
 WPGB in Pittsburgh, Pennsylvania
  in Crewe, Virginia
  in Ocean City-Salisbury, Maryland
  in Tampa, Florida
  in Naples, Florida
  in Coalmont, Tennessee
  in Poughkeepsie, New York
 WSWJ-LP in Hager City, Wisconsin
 WSWL-LP in Valdosta, Georgia
 WTHG in Hinesville, Georgia
  in Dayton, Ohio
  in Spencer, West Virginia
  in Escanaba, Michigan
 WYUN-LP in Coconut Creek, Florida
 WYZT-LP in Annapolis, Maryland
 WZMO-LP in Marion, Ohio
 WZOS in Berlin, Wisconsin
 WZUP in La Grange, North Carolina
  in Birmingham, Alabama

References

Lists of radio stations by frequency